Feliks Villard (4 November1908 – date of death unknown) was an Estonian chess player.

Biography
In Estonian Chess Championship Feliks Villard has won silver (1952) and 2 bronze (1950, 1951) medals. In Estonian Team Chess Championship he has won 2 gold (1931 - with Tallinn Kalev team, 1949 - with Tallinn city team) and 2 silver (1936 - with Pärnu Maleselts team, 1938 - with Pärnu Kalev team) medals. 
Feliks Villard played for Estonia at sixth board in 3rd unofficial Chess Olympiad in Munich (+11 –4 =4) and won individual bronze medal. Also he two times played for Estonia in Soviet Team Chess Championships (1953, 1958). His last known tournament was Ilmar Raud memorial in Viljandi (1971) where he divided fourth place.

References

External links

 

1908 births
Year of death missing
Estonian chess players
Soviet chess players
Chess Olympiad competitors